Route 175 is a  state highway in central Connecticut, running from New Britain to Wethersfield.

Route description
Route 175 begins at an intersection with Route 71 in New Britain.  It heads east and north along the perimeter of Central Connecticut State University, then turns east again and intersects Route 9 at the Newington town line.  In Newington, it continues east across town, intersecting with Route 173 and Route 176.  At the Wethersfield town line, it meets US 5 and Route 15 (Berlin Turnpike) at a grade separated interchange, and continues east to end at an intersection with Route 99.

History
Route 175 was commissioned in 1932.  The original route followed the current route to Route 176 and the current Route 176 and its former extension into Hartford along Newington Avenue.  In 1940, the section north of the junction with Route 176 was transferred to Routes 176 and 176A. At the same time, Route 175 was extended east along former SR 775 to the Silas Deane Highway (then Route 9). In 1968, a section in Newington and Wethersfield was rerouted slightly to the north. Part of the old road was abandoned; the remainder was reassigned to modern SSR 405.

Junction list

References

External links

175
Transportation in Hartford County, Connecticut